The Kentucky Green Party is the state party organization for Kentucky of the Green Party of the United States.

History
The Kentucky Green Party was officially founded on July 23, 2011 during the Founding Statewide Convention in Lawrenceburg, Kentucky. Though the Kentucky Green Party was officially established in 2011, two candidates had competed in state elections as Green Party members in years prior.

In September 2012, the Kentucky Green Party succeeded in attaining enough signatures to have Jill Stein and Cheri Honkala appear on the ballot in Kentucky for President and Vice President.

On Saturday August 8, 2015 the Kentucky Green Party held its third statewide convention in Lexington, Kentucky and elected new officers for its Executive Committee.

Electoral history
The first Green Party candidate in Kentucky was Ken Sain who campaigned for the United States House of Representatives in 2000 and came in 3rd place.
The second Green Party candidate in Kentucky was Don Pratt who ran for the Lexington-Fayette Urban County Council in 2002 and came in second with 43% of the vote.
Geoff Young, a retired engineer who worked on energy policies for the state, ran as a Green Party candidate in the 2012 election for the Kentucky House of Representatives 45th District. Young came in third place with 8.73% of the vote.

In 2011, the newly formed Kentucky Green Party endorsed independent Gatewood Galbraith because of his strong opposition to mountaintop removal mining.

References

External links
 Official site

Kentucky
Politics of Kentucky
Political parties established in 2011
Political parties in Kentucky